Arslanović is a patronymic surname derived from the given name Arslan. It may refer to:

 Ibrahim Arslanovic (born 1952), Croatian footballer
 Izet Arslanović (born 1973), Bosnian footballer
 Mustafa Arslanović (born 1960), Bosnian footballer

Surnames
Bosnian surnames
Patronymic surnames